Darkness Falls from the Air is a 1942 novel by the British writer Nigel Balchin. It was inspired by Balchin's time working at the Ministry of Food and was both a critical and commercial success. During the Blitz on London a civil servant's family life begins to break down. 

Balchin's own first marriage broke up following a partner-swapping arrangement between the Balchins, the artist Michael Ayrton and the latter's partner Joan. Elisabeth Balchin also had an affair with the composer Christian Darnton. Balchin divorced Elisabeth in 1951 and she married Ayrton a year later. In the novel, Balchin included an unflattering caricature of Darnton as the poet Stephen Ryle and his relationship with Marcia.

References

Bibliography
 Clive James. At the Pillars of Hercules. Pan Macmillan, 2013.

1942 British novels
Novels by Nigel Balchin
Novels set in London
William Collins, Sons books